Sébastien Joly (born 25 June 1979 in Tournon-sur-Rhône) is a French former professional road racing cyclist, who competed as a professional between 2000 and 2011. He was diagnosed with testicular cancer on 25 June 2007, his 28th birthday. He underwent an operation and then completed radiotherapy treatment on 11 September. Joly joined former team  as a coach for the 2015 season.

Major results 

1999
 1st Paris–Roubaix Espoirs
 8th Overall Le Triptyque des Monts et Châteaux
2000
 1st Stage 5 Circuit des Mines
2001
 6th Tro-Bro Léon
2003
 1st Route Adélie de Vitré
 Tour du Limousin
1st Points classification
1st Young rider classification 
2005
 1st Overall Tour du Limousin
1st Stage 1
 4th Grand Prix d'Ouverture La Marseillaise
 5th Road race, National Road Championships
 10th Brabantse Pijl
2007
 1st Paris–Camembert
2009
 6th Overall Circuit de Lorraine
1st Stage 5
 9th Tour du Finistère
2011
 6th Overall Route du Sud
 6th Paris–Camembert

Grand Tour general classification results timeline

References

External links 

1979 births
Living people
French male cyclists
People from Tournon-sur-Rhône
Sportspeople from Ardèche
Cyclists from Auvergne-Rhône-Alpes
Cycling coaches